Mikadze is a Georgian surname, which may refer to:

 Georgi Mikadze (born 1983), Georgian footballer
 Gocha Mikadze (1965-2017), Georgian footballer and football coach
 Ekaterine Meiering-Mikadze (born 1967), Georgian diplomat
 Levan Mikadze (born 1973), Georgian footballer
 Miranda Mikadze (born 1989), Georgian chess grandmaster
 Tatia Mikadze (born 1988), Georgian tennis player

Georgian-language surnames
Patronymic surnames
Surnames from given names